This is a list of members of the Congress of Deputies (Spain).

 List of members of the 1st Congress of Deputies (Spain)
 List of members of the 2nd Congress of Deputies (Spain)
 List of members of the 3rd Congress of Deputies (Spain)
 List of members of the 4th Congress of Deputies (Spain)
 List of members of the 5th Congress of Deputies (Spain)
 List of members of the 6th Congress of Deputies (Spain)
 List of members of the 7th Congress of Deputies (Spain)
 List of members of the 8th Congress of Deputies (Spain)
 List of members of the 9th Congress of Deputies (Spain)
 List of members of the 10th Congress of Deputies (Spain)

External links 
 Congreso de los Diputados